The Bate family is an Australian political family:

Henry John Bate (19 April 1881 – 4 January 1967) was an Australian politician serving on Eurobodalla Shire Council and the New South Wales Legislative Assembly as a member of the Nationalist Party of Australia and the United Australia Party;
His son, Henry Jefferson Percival "Jeff" Bate, (5 May 1906 – 15 April 1984) was an Australian politician, representing the United Australia Party and the Liberal Party of Australia for most of his career, but ended as an independent.
Jeff Bate's second wife, Thelma Florence Bate CBE, (3 August 1904 – 26 July 1984) was an Australian community leader and women's activist.
his third wife, Dame Zara Bate DBE, (10 March 190914 June 1989) was an Australian fashion designer and widow of the Australian Prime Minister Harold Holt.

References

Australian families
Political families of Australia